The 1988 Tour de Romandie was the 42nd edition of the Tour de Romandie cycle race and was held from 10 May to 15 May 1988. The race started in La Chaux-de-Fonds and finished in Geneva. The race was won by Gerard Veldscholten of the Weinmann team.

General classification

References

1988
Tour de Romandie